William Kenny (1899 - 8 February 1978) was an Irish hurler. A versatile player who lined out as a half-back, a midfielder and a half-forward, he was a member of the Kilkenny team that won the 1922 All-Ireland Championship.

Kenny enjoyed a decade-long club career with Dicksboro. During that time he won county championship medals in 1923 and 1926.

After being selected for the Kilkenny senior team in 1922, Kenny was a regular on the team at various times over subsequent seasons. He won his first Leinster medal in 1922 before later winning his sole All-Ireland medal after Kilkenny's defeat of Tipperary in the final. Kenny won subsequent Leinster medals in 1923 and 1925.

A member of the Old IRA in his youth, Kenny was also heavily involved in coursing. He died after a short illness on 8 February 1978.

Honours

Dicksboro
Kilkenny Senior Hurling Championship (2): 1923, 1926

Kilkenny
All-Ireland Senior Hurling Championship (1): 1922
Leinster Senior Hurling Championship (3): 1922, 1923, 1925

References

1899 births
1978 deaths
Dicksboro hurlers
Kilkenny inter-county hurlers
All-Ireland Senior Hurling Championship winners